The Mount Royal Tunnel is a railway tunnel in Montreal, Quebec, Canada. The tunnel is the third longest in Canada, after the Mount Macdonald Tunnel and the Connaught Tunnel, and connects the city's Central Station, in Downtown Montreal, with the north side of Montreal Island and Laval and passes through Mount Royal.

The tunnel was originally proposed by the Canadian Northern Railway (CNoR) to provide access to Downtown Montreal without having to cross the already-congested area south of Mount Royal or the route around it to the east. The cost of the tunnel, along with an expansion to the west coast of Canada, caused CNoR to struggle financially before it was nationalized in 1918. Canadian National Railways (CNR), formed from CNoR and several other lines, took over the just-completed tunnel. When CNR also took over the Grand Trunk Railway (GTR) in 1923, access to Ottawa and Toronto along the GTR lines made the tunnel largely redundant, and it was limited mostly to branch lines.

Until 2014, the only trains using the tunnel were commuter trains from Exo's Deux-Montagnes service. From December 2014 to May 2020, it was also used by the Mascouche line, which serves the northeastern part of Montreal Island and the suburbs of Repentigny, Terrebonne, and Mascouche. Exo also considered rerouting its Saint-Jérôme line to Central Station via the tunnel from its current termini at Parc or Lucien L'Allier to save 15 minutes.

On May 11, 2020, the Mount Royal Tunnel closed for a period of about four years. It is expected to reopen in 2024, exclusively for Réseau express métropolitain services; two new stations will be added mid-tunnel as part of the works.

History

The tunnel was conceived in 1910 by the Canadian Northern Railway (CNoR) as a means to give the company access to downtown Montreal. The only easy routes along the south side of Mount Royal had long been taken by rivals Canadian Pacific Railway (CPR) and Grand Trunk Railway (GTR). CNoR wanted to avoid crossing the CPR and GTR lines. Likewise CNoR preferred a direct route as opposed to detouring the railway around the north and east sides of Mount Royal.

To finance the costly tunnel option, CNoR planned to develop the low-valued farmland north of Mount Royal into a model community which was named the Town of Mount Royal. CNoR also planned a downtown terminal and associated office and retail developments for low-priced lands at de la Gauchetière Street and McGill College Avenue. Several farms which grew the Montreal melon were bought by the builders to make way for the tracks: "There were two years of preliminary bargaining, after which currency by the satchel full was paid over to the owners of the farms which made the Montreal melons famous, in the purchase of their land. More than $1,500,000 was paid out in that way, with currency, in the rush of land speculation that followed the announcement of the plan. One farmer was paid $117,000 and another
farm brought $781,783."

In 1911, the Canadian Northern Montreal Tunnel and Terminal Company was incorporated to build the tunnel and terminal. It was renamed Mount Royal Tunnel and Terminal Company in 1914, and was a wholly owned subsidiary of CNoR. Construction started at the west portal on July 8, 1912.

CNoR placed an order with General Electric in 1914 for 6 boxcab electric-powered locomotives for use in the tunnel; they were delivered in 1916–1917. Both the locomotives and the electrification were very similar to those of the Butte, Anaconda and Pacific Railway. Lining of the tunnel bore with concrete was completed by 1916 and the 2 parallel standard gauge tracks and 2400 V DC catenary were installed by September 1918. Progress was slowed by the First World War and CNoR's ongoing financial difficulties by the mid-1910s. The first train, with locomotive 601 leading, ran through the tunnel October 21, 1918. The event was little-noticed due to the still-ongoing war and a ban on large public gatherings due to the Spanish flu epidemic.

On September 6, 1918, the insolvent CNoR was nationalized by the federal government when its board of directors was replaced by a government appointed board of management, implemented by the Department of Railways and Canals. At the same time, the newly appointed board at CNoR was directed to take over the operation of the government-owned Canadian Government Railways (CGR). On December 20, 1918, the Privy Council issued an order creating the Canadian National Railways (CNR) to operate CNoR, CGR and eventually other bankrupt private-sector railways. Ironically, the Grand Trunk became part of CNR in 1923, giving CNR better routes to Ottawa and Toronto and relegating the tunnel line to branch-line status. Nevertheless, it still remains an essential part of Montreal's regional transport system.

CNR took over the Mount Royal Tunnel at the time of its completion, along with the virtually empty lands which CNoR's owners, Sir William Mackenzie and Sir Donald Mann, had envisioned would become a signature real estate development. CNR developed this area sporadically from the 1930s to the 1960s, interrupted by the Great Depression and the Second World War.

A new terminal, begun in 1931, opened as Central Station on July 14, 1943, resulting in the closure of the "temporary" CNoR-era Tunnel Terminal near the same location. Central Station consolidated CNR's passenger terminals in the city and also replaced Bonaventure Station which CNR had inherited from GTR.  In the late 1950s, the remainder of the CNoR lands acquired in downtown Montreal during the Mount Royal Tunnel project were developed by CNR. The signature Queen Elizabeth Hotel opened in 1958, followed by the CN (name/acronym change in 1960) headquarters building in 1961 and Place Ville-Marie in 1962.

On July 1, 1982, CN signed a 10-year agreement with STCUM whereby CN operated the line under contract to STCUM's commuter rail service. On February 12, 1992, Quebec's provincial government announced a $289 million modernization of the Mount Royal Tunnel line, including $130 million awarded to Bombardier for 58 new commuter rail cars. Stations, track, electrification and signalling systems were all upgraded, in addition to the tunnel structure itself.

On June 2, 1995, the last of the GE boxcab electric-powered locomotives delivered to CNoR in 1916–1917 for use in the tunnel were retired by CN after nearly 77 years of service. Locomotive 601, which in 1918 pulled the first train into the tunnel, under its final number as Canadian National 6711 pulled the last outbound train; on the return trip it assisted sister 6710. The old rolling stock was replaced by 58 state-of-the-art MR-90 electric multiple units built by Bombardier Transportation.

Recent use

Until May 2020, commuter trains from Exo's Deux-Montagnes and Mascouche lines used the Mount-Royal Tunnel. Before 1995, Via Rail trains to/from Northern Quebec and the northern route to Quebec City (cancelled in 1990) also used the tunnel, being hauled up by boxcabs pre-1990, and coasting downhill. This practice was eliminated when the catenary and signalling were replaced in 1995. The old catenary was 3000 V DC (upgraded from the original 2400 V DC in the early 1980s) and the new catenary is 25 kV AC. The new signalling is CTC. The ventilation shaft is too small to allow the use of diesel electric locomotives in the tunnel.

Purchase of the line by the former AMT

On February 28, 2014, the Réseau de transport métropolitain's predecessor agency (AMT) and CN announced that the AMT had purchased the Deux-Montagnes line from CN for a sum of $97 million. The agreement gives CN trackage rights for freight trains outside two rush-hour exclusive time windows (08:30–15:30 and 20:30–05:30).

Double-tracking to Roxboro-Pierrefonds

As part of the change to light-rail standards of the REM, the double-tracking of the line from Bois-Franc to Roxboro-Pierrefonds is taking place, which will enable the REM to significantly increase the number of trains on the line. There was a second track from Bois-Franc to slightly past Saraguay (about halfway between Bois-Franc and Sunnybrooke at the A13), but it was not electrified and had been used by CN freight trains serving industries along Doney spur.

Mascouche line

On December 1, 2014, the Mascouche line opened to passengers. The line used the Deux-Montagnes line until Jonction de l’Est (between the Montpellier and Mont-Royal stations), where it turned onto the St-Laurent subdivision on the way to Mascouche. Trains were operated with dual-powered ALP-45DP locomotives, and initially ran under electric power to the Ahuntsic station, where they changed over to diesel. Service  through the Mount Royal Tunnel ended in May 2020.

REM 

The Réseau express métropolitain is replacing this part of the Réseau de transport métropolitain along with the entire Deux-Montagnes line as well as a part of the Mascouche line. In addition, two new stations are being constructed mid-tunnel directly below existing stations of the Montreal Metro, specifically Édouard-Montpetit and McGill stations.

See also 
 Line 3 Red (Montreal Metro), an unrealized rapid transit line which would have used the tunnel

References

External links
 Exploring the Mount Royal tunnel ventilation shaft

Canadian National Railway tunnels
Transport in Montreal
Railway tunnels in Quebec
Mount Royal
Tunnels completed in 1918
1918 establishments in Quebec